Egyptian Law 102 of 1983 for Nature Protectorates in Egypt states:

 Article (1) :
-In implementing the articles of this Law, a natural protectorate is defined as any area of Land, or coastal or inland water characterized by flora, fauna, and natural features having cultural, scientific, touristic or esthetic value. These areas will be designated and delineated by Decree of the Prime Minister upon the recommendation of the Egyptian Environmental Affairs Agency.

 Article (2) :
-	It is forbidden to commit actions (deeds or activities or undertakings) which will lead to the destruction or deterioration of the natural environment or harm the biota (terrestrial, marine or fresh water), or which will detract from the esthetic (beauty) standards within protected areas.

- In particular, the following acts are forbidden:
 Catching transporting killing or disturbing wildlife;
 Damaging or removing any living organisms or natural features and resources, such as shells, corals, rocks, or soil for any purpose;
 Damaging or removing plants (from) the protected areas:
 Spoiling or destroying the geological structures (and other features) of areas serving as natural habitats and breeding areas for plants and animals;
 Introducing foreign (non-indigenous) species of biota into the protected area;
 Polluting the soil, water, or air of the protected areas in any manner.

-	It is also forbidden to erect buildings and establishments, pave roads, drive vehicles, or undertake any agriculture, industrial, or commercial activities in the protected areas except with the permission of the concerned Administrative Body and restrictions specified by the Prime Ministerial Decree.

 Article (3) :

-	It is forbidden to undertake activities or experiments in the areas surrounding designated protectorates, which will have an effect on the protectorates' environment and natures, except with the permission of the concerned Administrative Body.

 Article (4) :
- The Administrative Body (responsible for the enforcement of the provisions of this Law and related decrees) will be specified in a separate Decree issued by the Prime Minister. This Administrative Body will be empowered to establish regional offices within the Governorates having protectorates, and will be responsible for the following functions:
 Preparation and execution of necessary studies and programs to enhance protectorates;
 Surveying and monitoring natural features and wildlife within the protectorates, and creating a registry of same;
 Managing and coordinating activities related to the protectorates;
 Guiding and educating the public about the natural resources within protectorates, and the objectives and reasons for creating protectorates;
 Exchanging information and experiences relevant to the protectorates and natural resources therein with other countries and international organizations;
 Managing (operational) funds referred to in Article VI, below.

 Article (5) :
-	Societies for the protection of the environment, promulgated in accordance with national legislation, will be permitted to seek counsel with the concerned Administrative and with the judicial bodies to implement the provisions of the Laws and Decrees concerning the protection of the natural resources of the protectorates.

 Article (6) :
- A special Fund will be established to collect donations, grants, and (part) admission fees (as appropriate) as well as fines incurred by violators of this Law.
- The Fund will be used for the following purposes:
 Supplementing the budget of the Administrative Body responsible for implementing the provisions of this Law;
 Enhancement of the protectorates;
 Undertaking surveys and field research on natural resources within the protectorates;
 Paying rewards to persons who provide information concerning offenses or who apprehend offenders who contravene the provisions of this Law.

 Article (7) :
- Notwithstanding a stronger penalty specified in another Law, any person who contravenes the provision of Articles II and III of this Law and the Executive Decrees associated with it, will be fined not less than LE 500 (five hundred Egyptian pounds) and not more than LE 5000 (five thousand Egyptian pounds) and/or will be imprisoned for not more than one year.
- Recurrent offenders will be fined not less than LE 3000 (three thousand Egyptian pounds) and not more than LE 10.000 (ten thousand Egyptian pounds) and/or will be imprisoned for not less than one year.

-	In addition to this, the offender will bear the cost of removal or reparations specified by the concerned Administrative Body's representatives will be empowered to confiscate equipment, weapons or tools used in committing the offense.

 Article (8) :
-	The fines and the cost of reparation will be collected through administrative procedures and without delay.

 Article (9) :
-	Competent officials of the concerned Administrative Body responsible for enforcing this Law and the associated Executive Decrees will be designated in a Decree (Order) from Minister of justice upon consultation with the concerned Minister, and shall be accorded magistrate-level judicial powers concerning violations specified in this Law.

 Article (10) :
- Any provision contrary to the provisions of this Law is abrogated.

 Article (11) :
- This Law is to be published in the Official Gazette and will be enacted within three months of the date of publication.
- Issued at the presidency on July 18, 1983 (9 Shawwal 1403 11) and signed by Hosni Mubarak.
- Ratified by the Egyptian parliament (people's Assembly) and Senate (Shura Council) on July 31, 1983.

See also
Egyptian Protectorates

1983 in Egypt
1983 in the environment
1983 in law
Nature conservation in Egypt
Law of Egypt
Environmental law in Egypt